Timeline of the Serbian Revolution.

Prelude
Assassination of Vizier Hadži Mustafa Pasha (15 December 1801)
Slaughter of the Knezes (January 1804)
Orašac Assembly (14 February 1804)

First Serbian Uprising
 
 Battle of Vračar (17 February 1804)
 Battle of Rudnik (28 February 1804)
 Battle of Svileuva (11 March 1804)
 Battles of Batočina and Jagodina (23–27 March 1804)
 Battle of Kragujevac (1804)
 Battle of Drlupa (April 1804)
 Battle of Čokešina (28 April 1804)
 Battle of Šabac (1 May 1804)
 Ostružnica Assembly (6–15 May 1804)
 Battle of Požarevac (18 May 1804)
 Battle of Osat (1804)
 Pećani Assembly (17 April 1805)
 Battle of Užice (1805) 
 Battle of Karanovac (29 June 1805)
 Battle of Adakale (1805)
 Battle of Ivankovac (August 1805)
 Borak Assembly (15 August 1805)
 Battle of Rudnik
 Battle of Vrbica
 Smederevo Assembly (25–30 November 1805)
 Battle of Bratačić (1 August 1806)
 Battle of Mišar (12–15 August 1806)
 Battle of Sikirić (29 September 1806)
 Smederevo Assembly (1–5 November 1806)
 Battle of Deligrad (December 1806)
 Siege of Belgrade (November–December 1806)
 Liberation of Belgrade (1807)
 Ičko's Peace (13 July 1806–January 1807)
 Battle of Loznica (1807)
 Belgrade Assembly (25 February–6 March 1807)
 Russian–Serbian Alliance (10 July 1807)
 Battles of Malajnica and Štubik
 Kruščica Rebellion (12 July 1808)
 Battles of Oklenac, Vranjkovina and Pribićevac (31 October 1808) 
 Belgrade Assembly (14–15 December 1808)
 Battle of Jasika
 Battle of Prahovo
 Siege of Niš (May 1809)
 Battle of Čegar (31 May 1809)
 Battle of Suvodol (late May 1809)
 Palanka Assembly (2–8 October 1809)
 Belgrade Assembly (1–2 January 1810)
 Battle on the Drina (1810)
 Battle of Varvarin
 Battle of Loznica (17–18 October 1810)
 Belgrade Assembly (1–12 January 1811)
 Topola Assembly (17 July 1812)
 Vraćevšnica Assembly (15–16 August 1812)
 Kragujevac Assembly (1–2 January 1813)
 Battle of Mačva
 Battle of Loznica (August 1813)
 Battle of Ravnje (August 1813)
 Hadži Prodan's Revolt (mid–September 1814)

Second Serbian Uprising

 Takovo Meeting (11 April 1815)
 Battle of Čačak
 Battle of Palež
 Battle of Požarevac
 Battle of Ljubić (8 May 1815)
 Battle of Dublje (26 July 1815)
 Crnuća Assembly (19 December 1815)
 Belgrade Assembly (11 May 1816)
 Belgrade Assembly (6 November 1817)

See also
Revolutionary Serbia
List of Serbian Revolutionaries

References

 

Serbian Revolution
Serbian history timelines
Serbian military-related lists
Serbia politics-related lists